The North Central Football League is an Australian rules football league based in North Central Victoria, Australia.

The League was formed in 1930. Previous leagues in the area were the Birchip Football Association (as it was last called until it disbanded in 1919), North-Western Football Association (1910–1919),  the North-Western District Football Association (1920–1925), and the North Central District Football League (1926–1929).

Clubs

Current

List of NCFL premiers

	1930	St Arnaud
	1931	No comp
	1932	St Arnaud
	1933	St Arnaud
	1934	St Arnaud
	1935	Woomelang
	1936	Donald
	1937	Donald
	1938	Watchem-Litchfield
	1939	Donald
	1940	Charlton
	1941	- 1944 WWII	
	1945	Laen-Litchfield
	1946	Charlton
	1947	Charlton
	1948	St Arnaud
	1949	Donald
	1950	Charlton

	1951	Wedderburn
	1952	Wycheproof
	1953	Watchem-Corack
	1954	Boort
	1955	Wycheproof
	1956	Narraport
	1957	Wycheproof
	1958	St Arnaud
	1959	Birchip
	1960	Watchem-Corack
	1961	Watchem-Corack
	1962	Watchem-Corack
	1963	Donald
	1964	Wycheproof-Narraport
	1965	Wycheproof-Narraport
	1966	Charlton
	1967	Wycheproof-Narraport
	1968	Wedderburn

	1969	Watchem-Corack
	1970	Wedderburn
	1971	Watchem-Corack
	1972	Wycheproof-Narraport
	1973	Charlton
	1974	Charlton
	1975	Wycheproof-Narraport
	1976	Wycheproof-Narraport
	1977	Wycheproof-Narraport
	1978	St Arnaud
	1979	Donald
	1980	Donald
	1981	Wycheproof-Narraport
	1982	Boort
	1983	Wycheproof-Narraport
	1984	Wycheproof-Narraport
	1985	Wycheproof-Narraport
	1986	Birchip

	1987	Donald
	1988	St Arnaud
	1989	Charlton
	1990	Charlton
	1991	Wycheproof-Narraport
	1992	Donald
	1993	Donald
	1994	Birchip
	1995	Wycheproof-Narraport
	1996	Wycheproof-Narraport
	1997	Wycheproof-Narraport
	1998	St Arnaud
	1999	St Arnaud
	2000	Wycheproof-Narraport
	2001	Birchip-Watchem
	2002	Donald
	2003	Charlton
	2004	Donald

	2005	Charlton
	2006	Donald
	2007	Wedderburn
	2008	Boort
	2009	Charlton 
	2010	Wycheproof-Narraport
	2011	Wedderburn
	2012	Wedderburn
	2013	Wedderburn
	2014	Wedderburn
	2015	St Arnaud
	2016	Charlton
	2017	Wycheproof-Narraport
   2018    Wycheproof-Narraport
   2019    Sea Lake Nandaly Tigers
   2020    League in recess due to COVID-19 pandemic 
   2021    ''Finals not played due to COVID-19 pandemic 
   2022    Birchip-Watchem

Grand Finals

2004 Ladder

2005 Ladder

2006 Ladder

2007 Ladder

2008 Ladder

2009 Ladder

2010 Ladder

2011 Ladder

2012 Ladder

2013 Ladder

2014 Ladder

2015 Ladder

2016 Ladder

2017 Ladder

External links 
North Central Football League - Official Website)
 Full Points Footy - North Central Football League
BigFooty.com - North Central Football League discussion

 http://www.foxsportspulse.com/assoc_page.cgi?c=1-6186-0-0-0&sID=236237

Australian rules football competitions in Victoria (Australia)